O'Dowd Cove is an ice-filled cove of Abbot Ice Shelf between Williamson Peninsula and Von der Wall Point on the south side of Thurston Island. Named by Advisory Committee on Antarctic Names (US-ACAN) after Commander William O'Dowd, Aviation Officer of the seaplane tender USS Pine Island in the Eastern Group of U.S. Navy Operation Highjump, 1946–47.

Maps
 Thurston Island – Jones Mountains. 1:500000 Antarctica Sketch Map. US Geological Survey, 1967.
 Antarctic Digital Database (ADD). Scale 1:250000 topographic map of Antarctica. Scientific Committee on Antarctic Research (SCAR), 1993–2016.

References

Coves of Antarctica
Bodies of water of Ellsworth Land